Reggie Telmo Valdez (born October 4, 1975), known professionally as Reggie Lee, is a Filipino-American film and television actor. On television, he has played William "Bill" Kim on Prison Break and Sergeant Drew Wu on Grimm. In film, he has played Tai Huang in the Pirates of the Caribbean franchise, GCPD Officer Ross in The Dark Knight Rises and Lance Nguyen in The Fast and the Furious.

Early life
Valdez was born in Quezon City, the Philippines, to Zenaida Telmo and Jesus Espiritu Valdez.  Although fluent in English, he also speaks Tagalog. At the age of five, he moved with his family to the Cleveland, Ohio area, including Parma and Strongsville. While still a student, he performed in shows at the Greenbrier Theatre (now the Cassidy Theatre) in Parma Heights and was an intern at the Cleveland Play House. He graduated from Padua Franciscan High School in Parma.

Although accepted to Harvard, he instead decided to move to Los Angeles to pursue acting. He later changed his last name from Valdez to Lee, stating in a 2001 interview that "they kept calling me in for Hispanic roles, and I'm a far cry from Hispanic"; he took the name Lee from his grandparents.

Career
In 1992, at the age of 17, Lee moved to Los Angeles, where he joined a national tour of Miss Saigon. He later worked as a dancer for Prince on the MTV Video Music Awards and toured nationally with the musical Heartstrings. He was in the original company of the 1994 Broadway revival of Carousel. In 1997, he received a Drama-Logue Award for his performance in F.O.B. at East West Players, an Asian-American theatre organization in Los Angeles. With his role garnering critical acclaim, he also starred in their production of Carry the Tiger to the Mountain.

Since starring as Lance Nguyen in The Fast and the Furious, Lee appeared as Tai Huang in the Walt Disney Pictures film Pirates of the Caribbean: Dead Man's Chest. He has played Secret Service Special Agent Bill Kim in the FOX drama Prison Break, a character he describes as "a guilty pleasure to play, wonderfully complex and devious". He appeared in Chinaman's Chance, about which he said "It's an important story that definitely needs to be told and humanized. Plus I get to play pretend in the Old West. How great is that?"

In 2010, he guest-starred as Tom in the NBC series Persons Unknown.

In 2012, he played Ross, a Gotham City police officer in Christopher Nolan's The Dark Knight Rises.

From 2011 to 2017, he played Desk Sergeant Drew Wu in the NBC supernatural police drama Grimm.

In 2018, for NCIS: New Orleans, he appeared as Assistant Special Agent in Charge Steven Thompson. He previously appeared in an unrelated role in an episode of NCIS. In 2021, Blogtalk with MJ Racadio named him one of the "75 Most Influential Filipino-Americans".

Personal life
Lee has two younger brothers, musician Nathan and comic book artist R.V. Valdez.

Filmography

Film

Television

Video games

References

External links

Reggie Lee at FEARnet

American male film actors
Filipino emigrants to the United States
American male actors of Filipino descent
American male television actors
American male voice actors
20th-century American male actors
21st-century American male actors
Living people
1975 births
People from Strongsville, Ohio